Patabendi Don Jinadasa Nandasiri Wijeweera (14 July 1943 – 13 November 1989, better known by his nom de guerre Rohana Wijeweera, was a Sri Lankan Marxist political activist, revolutionary and the founder of the Janatha Vimukthi Peramuna (JVP). Wijeweera led the party in two unsuccessful insurrections in Sri Lanka, in 1971 and 1987 to 1989.

He formed the JVP in 1965, with the intention of replacing the Dominion of Ceylon with a socialist republic. The JVP ideologically supported the Tamil militants, calling it a war for self-determination, but opposed the Liberation Tigers of Tamil Eelam. Following the Indo-Lanka accord, the JVP, with the leadership of Wijeweera and a secondary faction, launched a military and social campaign with the aim of overthrowing the government of Sri Lanka. This included two major insurgencies, in 1971 and 1987–1989.

In 1989, the government of Sri Lanka then launched Operation Combine with the intention of killing Wijeweera. While they succeeded, the JVP maintained its identity as a political party and later joined a coalition government.

Early life
Patabendi Don Jinadasa Nandasiri Wijeweera was born on 14 July 1943 (Bastille Day), to Patabendi Don Andris Wijeweera and Nasi Nona Wickramakalutota, who lived in Kottegoda, a coastal village situated close to Matara in southern Sri Lanka and mostly belonged to the Karava caste hierarchy. The eldest in the family, he had a younger brother Ananda and a younger sister Chitranie.

His father, who ran a small business, was an active member of the Ceylon Communist Party and very close to Dr. S. A. Wickramasinghe. He was disabled after an attack by thugs believed to be members of an opposing political party during the 1947 Parliamentary election campaign for the Hakmana electorate candidate  Premalal Kumarasiri. Don Andris Wijeweera died in 1965.

Education
Wijeweera had his primary education at Goda Uda Government School in Kottegoda from 1947 to 1953. In 1954 he entered Goda Uda Government Senior School and was there until mid-1959. He entered Ambalangoda Dharmashoka College in July 1959 to study GCE Ordinary Level in the science stream. Although he passed the exam, gaining credit grades for some subjects, he was not able to continue his studies due to limited family finances. 

Having become active in the communist party, he applied and gained a scholarship to attend the Lumumba University to study medicine and in September 1960 he went to the Soviet Union. He completed the Russian language examination within seven and a half months, obtaining a distinction, and spent his holidays travelling through the USSR. He also worked during this time as an agricultural worker in the Moldavian Republic. He worked through his medical studies well up to third year and also obtained a distinction in political economics in 1963. 

In late 1963 he became ill and received medical treatment from a hospital in Moscow, but finally requested a full academic term of medical leave and returned to Ceylon. At that time the Communist Party of Ceylon was divided into two groups which were pro-Chinese and pro-Soviet. A vocal supporter of the pro-Chinese wing Ceylon Communist Party (Maoist), he did not get a visa to return to the USSR.

Political career, 1965-1971
Following his ideological dispute with the now revisionist 
Communist Party of Soviet Union, Wijeweera became a functionary of the Ceylon Communist Party-Peking Wing the pro-China faction of the Communist Party of Sri Lanka. There he started an admiration for 
Josef Stalin and also for Mao Zedong; he met with members of the Stalinist Labour Party of Albania in 1965, as they visited Ceylon.

New Left Movement

Soon Wijeweera was impatient with the CCP Maoist leaders due to what he saw as their lack of revolutionary purpose, and formed his own movement on 14 May 1965 after a discussion held in a house at Akmeemana in the Galle district with like-minded youth. He visited North Korea to broaden support for the newly formed movement. 

Initially identified simply as the "New Left", this group drew on students and unemployed youths from rural areas, most of them in the 16 to 25-year-old range who felt that their economic interests had been neglected by the nation's leftist coalition governments. It became popularly known as the New Left Movement, a Marxist political party, but not Maoist.

After forming the political movement, Wijeweera named it Janatha Vimukthi Peramuna (JVP). He conducted a series of political lectures for the purpose of educating the youths according to the Marxist-Leninist doctrine. These lectures were popularly known as JVP five classes, eventually became the key manifesto of their political ideology.

Crisis of the capitalist system in Sri Lanka
The history of the left movement in Sri Lanka
The history of the socialist revolutions
Indian expansionism
The path of revolution in Sri Lanka

Capturing state power for the purpose of implementing the JVP's socio-economic policies in the country was the key part of Wijeweera's political agenda. During the late 1960s, Wijeweera and the JVP consisted of disillusioned youths who believed that armed struggle is the most suitable way to a socialist revolution.

1971 Insurrection

In 1970 while campaigning for the United Front of Sirimavo Bandaranaike in the general election, Wijeweera was arrested following the riot in front of the U.S embassy, but released shortly as the pro-socialist United Front won the elections.

In April 1971 JVP led an armed campaign known as the 1971 April Uprising, a failed attempt to overthrow the Dominion of Ceylon under the government of Prime Minister Sirimavo Bandaranaike. North Korean boats were arrested attempting to arm the JVP.

Wijeweera was arrested before the armed attack took place in April 1971. He was later brought before the Criminal Justice Commission (CJC) that was formed after the failed insurrection. The commission sentenced him to life imprisonment, after which he made an historic speech, stating "We May Be Killed But Our Voice Will Never Die", echoing  "History Will Absolve Me" by Fidel Castro at the end of Moncada Barracks trial in 1953. On appeal the sentence was reduced to 20 years rigorous imprisonment.

Political career, 1977-1983
After the victory of the pro-United States United National Party in the 1977 elections, the new government attempted to broaden its mandate with a period of political tolerance. Wijeweera was freed. The new government also tried to destroy its opposition from the pro-Soviet Union United Front.

Presidential elections
After the ban on the party was lifted, the JVP entered the arena of legal political competition. As a candidate in the 1982 presidential elections, Wijeweera finished third, with more than 250,000 votes (4%, as compared with Jayewardene's 3.2 million).

1987–1989 Insurrection

In 1987, the JVP launched a second insurrection. Unlike in 1971, this was not an open revolt, but a low intensity conflict with subversion, assassinations, raids, and attacks on military and civilian targets.

In October 1989, following the arrest and interrogation of two leading JVP members, Wijeweera was arrested, having been living on a tea estate in Ulapane, masquerading as a planter under the name of Attanayake.

Death 
On 13 November 1989 Wijeweera was shot dead, but the actual circumstances remain a subject of speculation. Several versions of his death were circulated following the incident. The Sri Lankan Army stated that he had been shot in a confrontation between members of the JVP and the Army when he was taken under custody to help look at a JVP safe house. A rumour circulated that he was taken to a cemetery, shot in the leg and then summarily executed by being burnt alive in the crematorium. The official line from Minister of State Defence Ranjan Wijeratne's press brief was that Wijeweera and a fellow JVP member H.B. Herath had been taken to the safe house to help the Army locate part of the JVP's "treasure", while the search was in progress Herath had pulled out a gun and shot Wijeweera dead. It is widely believed that it was politically motivated assassination and that the Army, at the behest of the Government, was responsible for his death. Indeed, the Government itself gave conflicting answers, Foreign Minister A. C. S. Hameed corroborated Defence Minister Wijeratne's account that Herath had shot at Wijeweera, but states that the Army subsequently opened fire upon the two, killing both.

The  longest account of events leading up to Wijeweera's death surfaces from Major-General Sarath Munasinghe who recounts the situation in his book A Soldier's Version. According to Sarath, at 11.30pm, they reached the Operation Combine base. There were many other officers of other services as well. Wijeweera was brought to the conference room, where he spoke at length. Whenever Sarath questioned him in English, he replied in Sinhala.

In fact, he asked me whether I knew the Russian language. I replied in the negative. Rohana Wijeweera told me that his second language was Russian. He told me all about his personal life, initially at Bandarawela and later at Ulapane in Kandy. He was reluctant to talk about the activities of the JVP.

While this discussion was going on, the 'Operation Combine' commander was with his deputy in the adjoining room, which was his office. Just past midnight, the deputy Defense Minister General Ranjan Wijeratne walked in and sat at the head of the conference table. Gen Wijeratne asked few questions, but Rohana Wijeweera did not respond. Gen. Wijeratne joined the 'Operation Combine' commander in his office. "We continued with our conversation. We had many cups of plain tea (dark tea), while talking. I made a request to Rohana Wijeweera to advise his membership to refrain from violence. He agreed after persuasion. So we managed to record his words and also his picture in still camera."

After some time, a well-known Superintendent of Police arrived at the HQ Operation Combine. As the police officer walked in, he held Rohana Wijeweera's hair from the rear and gave two taps on Wijeweera's cheek. Wijeweera looked back, and having identified the officer said, 'I knew it had to be a person like you'. The police officer joined the Minister and Operation Combined Commander. Wijeweera related a few interesting stories. One day, a group of JVP activists had visited the residence of Nimal Kirthisri Attanayake [Rohana Wijeweera] at Ulapane. They demanded money for their movement. Wijeweera responded quickly by giving Rs 100. The youngsters did not have a clue about their leader. Wijeweera was full of smiles when he divulged this story. The time was around 3.45am on 13 November 1989. Sarath was informed to conclude the questioning and to take Rohana Wijeweera downstairs. "Together we walked downstairs and were close to each other. Wijeweera held my hand and said, 'I am very happy I met you even at the last moment. I may not live any longer. Please convey my message to my wife'. Rohana Wijeweera's message contained five important points. They were all very personal matters concerning his family.".

Moments later, Wijeweera was blindfolded and helped into the rear seat of a green Pajero. Two people sat on either side of Wijeweera. There were others at the rear of the vehicle. Just then a senior police officer arrived near the vehicle. Sarath then politely rejected his invitation to join them. The Pajero took off. He joined Col Lionel Balagalle standing near the main entrance of the Operation Combine HQ building, as the jeep left. We were having a brief chat when a senior officer came downstairs to get into his car. "We greeted him. He was in a very good mood.". But the atmosphere changed all of a sudden. A military police officer appeared in front of us. The senior officer blasted him for not accompanying Wijeweera and party. The military officer dashed towards his vehicle and sped away. The senior officer departed. Sarath concluded the first part "We also went home thinking of a good sleep.".

Late in the morning, Sarath was busy getting Wijeweera's photograph printed. No one would recognise Wijeweera without his beard. So Sarath had to seek help and add the beard to Wijeweera's photograph. It was done very well. Late in the afternoon there was a press conference at the Joint Operation Command. Minister Ranjan Wijeratne briefed the press. 'Wijeweera and HB Herath [another JVP leader] had been taken to a house just outside Colombo, where the JVP had hidden part of their "treasure". While the search was in progress, Herath pulled out a pistol and shot Wijeweera dead'. The minister went on to give more details. Sarath concludes his account.

Works

In 1971 Wijeeweera wrote the book A Few Experiences regarding his experiences during the first JVP insurgency. It was originally written in Sinhala

Wijeweera wrote "What is the answer for the Eelam Question" following the beginning of the Sri Lankan Civil War.

Vietnama Viplawaya Araksha Karaw was a book published by the Janatha Vimukthi Peramuna based on a speech by Wijeweera.

Family
Wijeweera married Srimathi Chitrangani, with whom he had four daughters and two sons. After his death in 1989, his widow and children handed themselves over to the Army Headquarters and the government assured protection for the family. They were housed at the staff quarters in SLN Dockyard in Trincomalee and later in 1992 were moved to staff quarters in the naval barracks at SLNS Gemunu in Welisara where they have lived under state patronage. In February 2015, the Security Council decided that there was no security threat and requested the family to vacate the naval quarters that they were occupying.

In popular media
The biographical film of Wijeweera's late life titled Ginnen Upan Seethala was made in 2019. The film was directed by Anurudha Jayasinghe and popular actor Kamal Addararachchi played Wijeweera's role.

See also
Communism in Sri Lanka
Nagalingam Shanmugathasan
Vijaya Kumaratunga

Further reading

References

Sources

External links

News media (Sinhala)
 Rohana Wijeweera 1
 Rohana Wijeweera 2
 Rohana Wijeweera 3
 Rohana Wijeweera 4
 Rohana Wijeweera 5

1943 births
1989 deaths
Sri Lankan rebels
Sri Lankan revolutionaries
Sri Lankan communists
Anti-revisionists
Peoples' Friendship University of Russia alumni
Janatha Vimukthi Peramuna politicians
Sri Lankan expatriates in the Soviet Union
Alumni of Dharmasoka College
Candidates in the 1982 Sri Lankan presidential election
Sinhalese politicians
Prisoners and detainees of Sri Lanka
Sri Lankan prisoners and detainees
People of the Sri Lankan Civil War
Indian Peace Keeping Force